David Michael Orazietti (born November 12, 1968) is a former politician in Ontario, Canada. He was a Liberal member of the Legislative Assembly of Ontario from 2003 to 2016 who represented the northern Ontario riding of Sault Ste. Marie. He served in the cabinet of Kathleen Wynne, most recently as Minister of Community Safety and Correctional Services, until he resigned on December 31, 2016. His resignation became effective January 1, 2017. In January 2017, Orazietti was appointed Dean of Aviation, Trades and Technology, Natural Environment and Business at Sault College.{

Background
Orazietti is a third-generation resident of Sault Ste. Marie, Ontario. He worked as a teacher for the Algoma District School Board for ten years. He and his wife Jane live in Sault Ste. Marie with their two children.

Politics
In 1997, Orazietti was elected to Sault Ste. Marie City Council in Ward One. He was re-elected to a second term in 2000.

He ran in the provincial election of 2003 as the Liberal candidate in the riding of Sault Ste. Marie. He defeated New Democratic incumbent Tony Martin by 8,671 votes. He was re-elected in the 2007, 2011, and 2014 elections, becoming the first MPP in the riding's history to be re-elected three times.

During his time in government Orazietti held several Parliamentary Assistant roles supporting ministers of cabinet including Minister of Natural Resources (2005-2007, 2009-2011) and Minister of Northern Development and Mines (2007-2009). He also served as Government Caucus Chair and parliamentary assistant to premier Dalton McGuinty from 2011 to 2013.

During his tenure, he brought forward several Private member bills to improve such things as the Northern Health Travel Grant and expansion of Highway 17.

On February 11, 2013, Premier Kathleen Wynne appointed him to cabinet as Minister of Natural Resources. On June 24, 2014, Wynne appointed him to a second ministry, this time as Minister of Government and Consumer Services.

On May 27, 2015 Orazietti introduced a new bill called Protecting Condominium Owners Act, 2015. The bill called for the creation of a new Condominium Authority that would facilitate dispute resolution between owners and boards. There would also be training and licensing of condominium management companies. Critics of the bill said that the bill would result in increased fees and more special assessments. It was passed into law on December 3, 2015.

On June 13, 2016, Wynne appointed Orazietti as Minister of Community Safety and Correctional Services. He resigned from cabinet on December 16, 2016 and announced his resignation as an MPP effective January 1, 2017.

After politics
Orazietti was appointed Dean of Aviation, Trades and Technology, Natural Environment and Business at Sault College in January 2017.

Cabinet positions

Provincial electoral record

References

External links

1968 births
21st-century Canadian politicians
Canadian people of Italian descent
Canadian schoolteachers
Living people
Members of the Executive Council of Ontario
Ontario Liberal Party MPPs
Sault Ste. Marie, Ontario city councillors